Kim Hyun is a South Korean actress and model. She is known for her roles in dramas such as Top Star U-back, The Great Show, Link: Eat, Love, Kill, and Sweet Home. She has also appeared in such movies as The Chase, Gangnam Blues, and Insane.

Filmography

Television

Film

Awards and nominations

References

External links
 
 

1971 births
20th-century South Korean actresses
Living people
21st-century South Korean actresses
South Korean female models
South Korean television actresses
South Korean film actresses
Fantagio artists